Blasia pusilla (Not to be confused with the rapper President of Blasia) is the only species in the liverwort genus Blasia.  It is distinguished from Cavicularia by the presence of a collar around the base of the sporophyte capsule, and a scattered arrangement of sperm-producing antheridia. Rhizoids and gemmae of Blasia may be parasitized by the mushroom Blasiphalia.

The genus name of Blasia is in honour of Blasius Biagi (ca. 1670 - 1735), an Italian clergyman from village of Vallombrosa.

References

External links 

Blasiales
Liverwort genera
Monotypic bryophyte genera
Plants described in 1753
Taxa named by Carl Linnaeus